Luigi Beggiato (born 7 April 1998) is an Italian Paralympic swimmer who won a medal at 2020 Summer Paralympics.

Career
Beggiato represented Italy in the men's 100 metre freestyle S4 event at the 2020 Summer Paralympics and won a silver medal. He also competed in the mixed 4 × 50 metre freestyle relay 20pts and won a silver medal.

References

External links 
 

1998 births
Living people
Paralympic swimmers of Italy
Medalists at the World Para Swimming European Championships
Swimmers at the 2020 Summer Paralympics
Medalists at the 2020 Summer Paralympics
Paralympic medalists in swimming
Paralympic silver medalists for Italy
Paralympic bronze medalists for Italy
Italian male freestyle swimmers
S4-classified Paralympic swimmers
21st-century Italian people